Harrisonville is an unincorporated community located within South Harrison Township, in Gloucester County, New Jersey. The area is served as United States Postal Service ZIP code 08039.

As of the 2000 U.S. Census, the population for ZIP Code Tabulation Area 08039 was 153.

Demographics

References

External links

Census 2000 Fact Sheet for ZIP Code Tabulation Area 08039 from the United States Census Bureau

South Harrison Township, New Jersey
Unincorporated communities in Gloucester County, New Jersey
Unincorporated communities in New Jersey